Ted Leo and the Pharmacists (sometimes written Ted Leo/Pharmacists, Ted Leo + Pharmacists, or TL/Rx) are an American rock band formed in 1999 in Washington, D.C. They have released six full-length studio albums and have toured internationally. Though the group's lineup has fluctuated throughout their career, singer/guitarist Ted Leo has remained the band's main songwriter, creative force, and only constant member. The group's music combines elements of punk rock, indie rock, art punk, traditional rock, and occasionally folk music and dub reggae. Their most recent album, The Brutalist Bricks, was released on March 9, 2010.

Band history

Formation 
Ted Leo started the Pharmacists essentially as a solo project in 1999. His previous band Chisel had broken up in the late 1990s, after which he spent time with the Spinanes and the Sin Eaters and acted as producer for the Secret Stars. In 1999, he recorded the album tej leo(?), Rx / pharmacists, a solo effort which was highly experimental and mixed elements of punk rock, reggae, dub and audio experimentation. In 2000, Leo expanded the project to a full band including James Canty on guitar, Jodi V.B. on bass and Amy Farina on drums. He named the backing band the Pharmacists, and the group released the EP Treble in Trouble. The EP moved away from many of the experimental elements of tej leo by relying on more traditional rock structures and instrumentation, though it still explored some non-traditional characteristics.

Lookout! Records years 
The band signed to Lookout! Records in 2001 and experienced more lineup changes as V.B. and Farina left the group. For the album The Tyranny of Distance, Leo and Canty utilized a number of in-studio backing musicians. The album incorporated multiple styles including Celtic rock, acoustic folk balladry and pop rock. During the supporting tours for The Tyranny of Distance, bassist Dave Lerner, drummer Chris Wilson and keyboardist Dorien Garry became permanent members of the band. The group's next album, 2003's Hearts of Oak, drew from punk rock and new wave influences. The EP Tell Balgeary, Balgury Is Dead soon followed and featured a number of Leo's solo songs and covers. The band's video documentary Dirty Old Town was released the same year.

Prior to the recording of 2004's Shake the Sheets, Garry and Canty left the band, reducing the group to a trio. The album explored social and political topics and experienced some success with the single "Me and Mia". The iTunes-exclusive EP Sharkbite Sessions followed in 2005.

Touch and Go Records years 

In 2006, Ted Leo and the Pharmacists left Lookout! amidst financial crises within the label, and signed a new contract with Chicago-based Touch and Go Records. The band's popularity continued to expand through constant touring and performances at large festivals such as the Coachella Valley Music and Arts Festival and the Pitchfork Music Festival. Their fourth full-band album, Living with the Living, was released on March 20, 2007. First-run copies of the album also included the Mo' Living EP. Former guitarist Canty rejoined them for touring in support of Living with the Living.

Bassist Lerner played his last show with the band at McCarren Park Pool in Brooklyn, NY on August 12, 2007. Marty "Violence" Key of the (Young) Pioneers replaced him on tour,. In April 2008, the band recorded a performance for the Beautiful Noise concert series in Toronto. They then performed as openers for six dates of Pearl Jam's 2008 U.S. tour in June.

They toured with Against Me! and Future of the Left in September and October 2008.

On September 15, 2008, the band released a surprise digital EP, Rapid Response, in response to the violence at the 2008 Republican National Convention in St. Paul, Minnesota. The EP was made available on the Touch and Go website for a choice of prices with all proceeds going to Democracy Now! and Food Not Bombs of St. Paul.

The Pharmacists' most recent album, The Brutalist Bricks, was released on March 9, 2010, followed by a tour of the United States and Europe. In September 2011, Key left the band to open a record store. The band has continued as a trio with Canty taking over on bass.

In a 2012 interview, Leo alluded to a new album to be released that summer, which has yet to be issued. In 2017, Leo released The Hanged Man under his own name.

On March 4, 2022, Ted Leo released a new EP titled "Andy, Come Out" on his Bandcamp, featuring two new songs and a cover of the song "Ping Pong" by Stereolab that Ted had played live the night before. This was followed up by "The Old 200 EP" on April 1.

Band members

Current members 
Ted Leo – vocals, guitar, piano
James Canty – guitar, keyboard, backing vocals
Chris Wilson – drums
Marty Key – bass, backing vocals
Adrienne Berry – saxophone, percussion, keyboard, backing vocals
Ralph Darden – guitar, backing vocals

Past members 
Jodi V.B – bass (1999–2001)
Amy Farina – drums (2000–2001)
Dorien Garry – keyboards (2002–2004)
Dave Lerner – bass, backing vocals (2002–2007)

Discography

Studio albums

EPs

Singles

Non-album tracks

Videography

Music videos

Video releases

References

External links 

Ted Leo and the Pharmacists collection at the Internet Archive's live music archive

Musical groups established in 1999
Touch and Go Records artists
Indie rock musical groups from Washington, D.C.
Punk rock groups from Washington, D.C.
1999 establishments in Washington, D.C.